The North Carolina United States Senate election of 1990 was held on November 6, 1990, as part of the nationwide elections to the Senate.  The general election was fought between the Republican incumbent Jesse Helms and the Democratic nominee former Mayor of Charlotte Harvey Gantt.  Helms won re-election to a fourth term by a slightly wider margin than the close election in 1984.

Helms drew controversy for airing what became known as the "Hands" ad produced by Alex Castellanos.  It showed a pair of white hands with the voiceover saying You wanted this job, but because of a law they had to give it to a minority. The ad prompted allegations of racism.

The election received renewed attention in 2020 with the release of ESPN miniseries The Last Dance, which mentioned Chicago Bulls superstar Michael Jordan refusing to endorse Gantt, who was seeking to become the first African-American to represent North Carolina - Jordan's home state - in the United States Senate.

Primaries

Republican primary

Democratic primary

Results

See also 
 1990 United States Senate elections

Footnotes 

1990
North Carolina
Jesse Helms
1990 North Carolina elections